Olivia Jordan Thomas (born September 28, 1988) is an American actress, model, television host, and beauty pageant titleholder, who was crowned Miss USA 2015. She represented the United States at Miss Universe 2015, where she placed as a second runner-up. Jordan also represented the United States at Miss World 2013 where she finished in the top 20. She is the first known woman from Oklahoma to be crowned as Miss USA.

Early life and education
Jordan was born and raised in Tulsa, Oklahoma to Bob and Jill Thomas. She is a fourth generation Tulsan, and attended Bishop Kelley High School. After graduating, Jordan moved to Boston, Massachusetts to attend Boston University. While a college student, Jordan became SAG-eligible through featured extra work in the movies Ted and Here Comes the Boom. While becoming a SAG member, Jordan learned that someone had already used the name "Olivia Thomas", and began using Jordan as her professional surname. She graduated in May 2011 with a Bachelor of Science in health sciences, and then moved to Los Angeles to pursue a career in modeling and acting.

Career

Pageantry
Jordan represented Beverly Hills in the Miss California USA 2013 on January 13, 2013, where she finished as first runner-up to Miss California USA 2013, Mabelynn Capeluj. Later that year, Jordan was appointed as Miss World America 2013 and competed at Miss World 2013 pageant, where she finished in the top 20 and was also first runner-up for Top Model.

On December 21, 2014, Jordan won the title of Miss Oklahoma USA 2015 by outgoing titleholder Brooklynne Young and later won the title of Miss USA 2015 on July 12, 2015, in Baton Rouge, Louisiana, making her the first entrant from Oklahoma to win and the first winner from the South since Kristen Dalton who won representing North Carolina in 2009 (though Nana Meriwether of Maryland was appointed as Miss USA following Olivia Culpo’s Miss Universe win in 2012). Her question as a Miss USA finalist asked who she would choose as an American woman to put on the next new bill design. She named Harriet Tubman. On April 20, 2016, the U.S. Treasury officially announced that it had chosen Tubman to be featured on the new $20 bill. During her reign, Donald Trump sold his stake in the Miss Universe Organization ending his affiliation with the beauty pageant. Jordan represented the United States in the Miss Universe 2015 pageant held on December 20, 2015, where she was named the second runner-up. Jordan wore a custom Berta Bridal dress to the evening gown portion of the competition, and was chosen among the top ten dressed in the competition.

Jordan was the third person from the United States to compete at two major international beauty pageants after Brucene Smith, who competed in Miss World 1971 and won Miss International 1974, and Andrea Neu, who previously competed at Miss International 2013 and Miss Earth 2014. However, she had the distinction of being the first woman to represent the United States at two of the largest and oldest international pageants in the world: Miss World and Miss Universe.

She is one of only ten former Miss World semifinalists to place in the Miss Universe semifinals, the others being Michelle McLean of Namibia in 1992, Christine Straw of Jamaica in 2004, Ada de la Cruz of the Dominican Republic in 2009, Yendi Phillipps also of Jamaica in 2010, Patricia Yurena Rodríguez of Spain in 2013, Catriona Gray of the Philippines in 2018, Maëva Coucke of France in 2019, Julia Gama of Brazil and Andrea Meza of Mexico both in 2020.

Personal life
In August 2018, Jordan became engaged to British actor Jay Hector, and they later married in November 2019. She gave birth to her daughter Lola in September 2021.

Politics
After finishing her reign as Miss USA 2015, Jordan has been vocal about her political beliefs. During the 2016 United States presidential election, Jordan was an outspoken critic of Republican candidate Donald Trump, and supported Democratic candidate Hillary Clinton. Following the 2019 passage of the Human Life Protection Act in Alabama and the Georgia heartbeat bill, Jordan publicly stated that she was molested as a child and raped as a teenager, and since "decisions were made for [her] body without [her] consent", she saw the passage of heartbeat bills as no different from her experience.

Filmography

References

External links

21st-century American actresses
Actresses from Tulsa, Oklahoma
American beauty pageant winners
American female models
American film actresses
American television actresses
American television hosts
Boston University alumni
Female models from Oklahoma
Living people
Miss USA 2015 delegates
Miss USA winners
Miss Universe 2015 contestants
Miss World 2013 delegates
Oklahoma Democrats
People from Tulsa, Oklahoma
American women television presenters
1988 births